Woodhouseite belongs to the beudantite group AB3(XO4)(SO4)(OH)6 where A = Ba, Ca, Pb or Sr, B = Al or Fe and X = S, As or P.  Minerals in this group are isostructural with each other and also with minerals in the crandallite and alunite groups. They crystallise in the rhombohedral system with space group Rm and crystals are usually either tabular {0001} or pseudo-cubic to pseudo-cuboctahedral.
Woodhouseite was named after Professor Charles Douglas Woodhouse (1888–1975), an American mineralogist and mineral collector from the University of California, Santa Barbara, US, and one-time General Manager of Champion Sillimanite, Inc.

Environment 
Woodhouseite is a secondary mineral found where wall rock alteration occurred in hydrothermal and disseminated ore deposits; rare in cave deposits, formed from guano.  At the type locality it occurs in vugs in quartz veins in an andalusite, Al2OSiO4, deposit.  This is in pre-Cambrian meta-quartzite that has been intruded by late Jurassic granitic rocks.  Woodhouseite is found only near masses of lazulite, MgAl2(PO4)2(OH)2.
Associated Minerals at the type locality include topaz, Al2SiO4F2, quartz, SiO2, augelite, Al2PO4(OH)3, lazulite, MgAl2(PO4)2(OH)2, tourmaline, baryte, BaSO4, muscovite, KAl2(Si3Al)O10(OH)2, and pyrophyllite, Al2Si4O10(OH)2, all of which formed before the woodhouseite, which is a late-forming mineral.

Localities 

The type locality is the Champion Mine (White Mountain Mine), White Mountain, Laws, White Mountains, Mono County, California, US.  This is a former sillimanite mine located near Laws; mineralisation is a metamorphic sillimanite deposit hosted in quartzite.

Structure 

Space Group: R 2/m
Unit Cell Parameters: a = 6.993 Å, c = 16.386 Å, Z: 3

References 

Aluminium minerals
Calcium minerals
Phosphate minerals
Trigonal minerals
Minerals in space group 166
Beudantite group